Barneveld is a hamlet (and census-designated place) located within the Town of Trenton in Oneida County, New York, United States. The population was 284 at the 2010 census, when it was an incorporated village. The name is derived from the name of the Dutch statesman Johan van Oldenbarnevelt (1547–1619).

The hamlet is in the eastern part of the town on NY 365.

History 
The village was founded in 1793 by Gerrit Boon, an agent of the Holland Land Company.

Mappa Hall was listed on the National Register of Historic Places in 1982.

In 1903, the post office and railroad station were redesignated as "Barneveld", though the legal name of the village was "Trenton", though it was only in 1975 that the legal name of the village was changed to Barneveld; prior to that, the village was still legally "Village of Trenton".

Geography

Demographics

As of the census of 2000, there were 332 people, 126 households, and 87 families residing in the village. The population density was 1,749.7 people per square mile (674.7/km2). There were 132 housing units at an average density of 695.7 per square mile (268.2/km2). The racial makeup of the village was 97.59% White, 0.90% African American, 0.30% Asian, 0.90% from other races, and 0.30% from two or more races. Hispanic or Latino of any race were 0.30% of the population.

There were 126 households, out of which 38.1% had children under the age of 18 living with them, 52.4% were married couples living together, 10.3% had a female householder with no male present, and 30.2% were non-families. 27.8% of all households were made up of individuals, and 7.1% had someone living alone who was 65 years of age or older. The average household size was 2.63 and the average family size was 3.24.

In the village, the population was spread out, with 31.3% under the age of 18, 7.5% from 18 to 24, 26.2% from 25 to 44, 25.3% from 45 to 64, and 9.6% who were 65 years of age or older. The median age was 36 years. For every 100 females, there were 98.8 males. For every 100 females age 18 and over, there were 96.6 males.

The median income for a household in the village was $41,071, and the median income for a family was $50,000. Males had a median income of $31,458 versus $26,667 for females. The per capita income for the village was $19,459. About 3.7% of families and 4.8% of the population were below the poverty line, including none of those under the age of eighteen or sixty-five or over.

Dissolution 
On June 6, 2017, the village voted 54–12 to dissolve, becoming a part of the town of Trenton. The village had until December 3, 2017, to create a dissolution plan, with the Village Clerk stating the goal was to dissolve by the end of 2017. Barneveld was 224 years old at the time of the vote. The village was dissolved on December 31, 2017.

Notable people 
David Esterly, woodcarver, sculptor, and writer
Richard L. Hanna, U.S. Representative from 2011 to 2017
Adam Gerard Mappa, Dutch military commander
François Adriaan van der Kemp, minister, Dutch Patriot, political emigre, scholar

References

Villages in New York (state)
Utica–Rome metropolitan area
Villages in Oneida County, New York
1793 establishments in New York (state)
Populated places disestablished in 2017